TeKoS is a Flemish "Nieuw Rechts" (Nouvelle Droite) publication. It is published by Knooppunt Delta.

History and profile
As with other Nouvelle Droite publications such as its inspiration Éléments, the themes in TeKoS are related to European culture, European nationalism, anti-egalitarianism and ecologism. The magazine has a new right stance. The editor-in-chief since its founding in 1979 is Luc Pauwels.

Co-editors:
1979: Hildegonde de Bois (until 1999), Marcel Deprins, Frans de Hoon (d. 1999), Paul Hendrik Leenaards (d. 1988), Karl van Marcke. 
1982: N.E. de Leeuw, Janus Meerbosch 
1985: Guy de Maertelaere
1989: Paul Janssen, Daan Goosen, Peter Logghe
1990: Erik Arckens (left 1999) 
1991: Koenraad Logghe (until 2001)
1992: Koenraad Elst (until 1995)
1994: Dirk Bollen (until 2000), Kurt Ravyts (until 1999), Piet Jan Verstraete
1995: Jan Creve (until 2000), Joris Smits
1999: Erik Martens 
2000: Jan Sergooris (until 2001), Frank Hensen, Arnout Collier
2001: Ingrid Berens, Wolfgang Goeminne, Marc Willems, Martine van der Heyden

See also
 Groupement de recherche et d'études pour la civilisation européenne

References

Literature
P. Commers, De Conservatieve Revolutie in Vlaanderen. Een kritische analyse van het Nieuw Rechtse tijdschrift Teksten, Kommentaren en Studies, Leuven, KUL, 1997.

External links
Official website
Nieuw Rechts in Vlaanderen. Het gedachtegoed van het Nieuw Rechtse tijdschrift ‘Teksten, Kommentaren en Studies’ (Sofie Delporte)

1979 establishments in Belgium
Magazines established in 1979
Magazines published in Flanders
Modern pagan magazines
Modern paganism in Europe
New Right (Europe)